The long-tailed woodcreeper (Deconychura longicauda) is a species of bird in the Dendrocolaptinae subfamily. It is monotypic within Deconychura, but formerly this genus also included the spot-throated woodcreeper.

The long-tailed woodcreeper is found in Bolivia, Brazil, Colombia, Costa Rica, Ecuador, French Guiana, Guyana, Honduras, Panama, Peru, Suriname, and Venezuela. Its natural habitat is subtropical or tropical moist lowland forests.

Among the woodcreepers, the long-tailed woodcreeper is genetically most closely related to the olivaceous woodcreeper (Sittasomus griseicapillus).

Seven subspecies are recognised.

 D. l. typica Cherrie, 1891 – Costa Rica and west Panama
 D. l. darienensis Griscom, 1929 – east Panama
 D. l. minor Todd, 1919 – north Colombia
 D. l. longicauda (Pelzeln, 1868) – the Guianas and north Brazil
 D. l. connectens Zimmer, JT, 1929 – east Colombia and south Venezuela to east Ecuador, east Peru and northwest Brazil
 D. l. pallida Zimmer, JT, 1929 – southeast Peru, north Bolivia and southwest Brazil
 D. l. zimmeri Pinto, 1974 – central Brazil

References

External links
 Species factsheet - BirdLife International
 Image and classification - Animal Diversity Web

long-tailed woodcreeper
Birds of Costa Rica
Birds of Panama
Birds of Colombia
Birds of the Ecuadorian Amazon
Birds of the Guianas
Birds of the Amazon Basin
long-tailed woodcreeper
long-tailed woodcreeper
Birds of Brazil
Taxonomy articles created by Polbot